Menka is the proper name of a late Second Dynasty Egyptian queen. It is uncertain who she was in a relationship with.

Fragment 
Very little is known about the life of Menka, a late Second Dynasty Egyptian queen, whose identity is known only from an unprovenanced basalt fragment. The name Menka means "the ka shall be durable" and the fragment her name is depicted on also includes the title “who sees Horus”, which was the title of queens in the early dynastic age and during the Old Kingdom. The fragment also includes a depiction of her.  

The relief depicts Menka as a standing woman, in a close-fitting dress, with a large, hemispherical vessel on her head and with standards lined up behind her. The hieroglyphs do not indicate who her consort was. Egyptologist Wolfgang Helck noticed that the scene bears considerable stylistic resemblance to an unfinished scene located on a basalt relief at the archaeological site of Gebelein, that is attributed to King Khasekhemwy, who was the last Pharaoh of the Second Dynasty of Egypt. Helck has suggested that the fragment of Menka's relief may also originate from that site.

References 

Second Dynasty of Egypt
Old Kingdom of Egypt
Ancient Egyptian women
Queens consort of the Second Dynasty of Egypt